Alper Mestçi is a screenwriter, film director and author from Turkey.

Life and career 
After starting his professional career in 1995, he edited write and directed programs such as ATV's Şok, Kanal D's Beyaz Show and Zaga, Kanal 6's Hızar, and TV8's Dikkat Şahan Çıkabilir, Zoka, Bi İş İçin Lazım and Uzman Avı. He also worked as a columnist for Milliyet and Tempo.

Mestçi, who prepared the anti-media / humor website named Shockhaber.com together with Hüseyin Özcan from 2001, later published the humor content available on his website as three separate books titled Saçmala, Radar Oldum, and Takıntılar respectively.

In 2003, he wrote the column "Serin Duruş" together with Hüseyin Özcan for the Milliyet newspaper, which was awarded for their delicate use of Turkish language at the Karaman Türk Dili Awards.

In 2005, he took on the duties of directing and screenwriting for an multimedia-sketch program called Dikkat Şahan Çıkabilir Alper Mestçi's film career started in 2006 when the horror story he prepared with Güray Ölgü and Şahan Gökbakar made it to the big screen and was adapted as a movie.

Mestçi, who had his first film directing experience in 2007 with Musallat, wrote the movie's screenplay together with Güray Ölgü.

In 2009, Mestçi, who had experience with the comedy genre during his television career, directed the comedy movie Kanal-i-zasyon, and continued his career by producing another horror film in 2010.

After releasing a sequel for Musallat in 2011, Mestçi started working on a series of horror movies titled SİCCÎN, and meanwhile directed the comedy movies Sabit Kanca and Sabit Kanca 2.

In 2015, he married the presenter of Gülhan'ın Galaksi Rehberi, Gülhan Şen.

Filmography 

| 2022 ||  Mahlûkat
|| Horror

Bibliography 
 "Radar Oldum" (with Hüseyin Özcan). Istanbul, 2003. 
 "Saçmalama" (with Hüseyin Özcan). Istanbul, 2003. 
 "Takıntılar" (with Hüseyin Özcan). Istanbul, 2005.

References

External links 

1969 births
Living people
Turkish male screenwriters
Turkish film directors
Turkish directors